Kristopher Horn (born April 25, 1994) is an American bobsledder.

He participated at the IBSF World Championships 2019, winning a medal.

He represented the United States at the 2022 Winter Olympics.

References

External links

1994 births
Living people
American male bobsledders
Bobsledders at the 2022 Winter Olympics
Olympic bobsledders of the United States